MediaWorks may refer to:
 MediaWorks New Zealand, runs many radio stations across New Zealand
 ASCII Media Works, a Japanese publishing house founded April 1, 2008
 MediaWorks (publisher), a former Japanese publishing, which merged to form ASCII MediaWorks on April 1, 2008
 SPH MediaWorks, a broadcasting company based in Singapore that was merged into MediaCorp